Atlantic Convoy is a 1942 American war film directed by Lew Landers. The story follows naval patrols based on the Icelandic coast battling the German U-boats during World War II, and the German efforts to infiltrate their operations with spies and saboteurs.

Cast 
 Bruce Bennett as Captain Morgan
 Virginia Field as Lida Adams
 John Beal as Carl Hansen
 Clifford Severn as Sandy Brown
 Larry Parks as Gregory
 Lloyd Bridges as Bert
 Victor Kilian as Otto
 Hans Schumm as Commander von Smith
 Erik Rolf as Gunther
 Eddie Laughton as Radio Operator
 Wilhelm von Brincken as U-Boat Officer

External links 
 

1942 films
1940s war films
1940s spy films
American war films
American spy films
Columbia Pictures films
Films directed by Lew Landers
World War II films made in wartime
Films set in Iceland
Seafaring films
American black-and-white films
1940s English-language films